The Amazon rubber boom (1879 to 1912) was an important part of the economic and social history of Brazil and Amazonian regions of neighboring countries, being related to the extraction and commercialization of rubber. Centered in the Amazon Basin, the boom resulted in a large expansion of European colonization in the area, attracting immigrant workers, generating wealth, causing cultural and social transformations, and wreaking havoc upon indigenous societies. It encouraged the growth of cities such as Manaus and Belém, capitals within the respective Brazilian states of Amazonas and Pará, among many other cities throughout the region like Itacoatiara, Rio Branco, Eirunepé, Marabá, Cruzeiro do Sul and Altamira; as well as the expansion of Iquitos in Peru, Cobija in Bolivia and Leticia in Colombia. The rubber boom occurred largely between 1879 and 1912. There was heightened rubber production and associated activities again from 1942 to 1945 during the Second World War.

Background

Natural rubber is an elastomer, also known as tree gum, India rubber, and caoutchouc, which comes from the rubber tree in tropical regions. Christopher Columbus was one of the first Europeans to bring news of this odd substance back to Europe, but he was not the only one to report it. Around 1736, a French astronomer recalled how Amerindians used rubber to waterproof shoes and cloaks. He brought several samples of rubber back to France. Rubber was used as an eraser by the British scientist Joseph Priestley, with "rubber" entering English parlance as a substitute for the term "eraser".

It was not until the 1800s that practical uses of rubber were developed and the demand for rubber began. A rubber factory that made rubber garters for women opened in Paris, France, in the year 1803.  However, the material still had disadvantages: at room temperature, it was sticky. At higher temperatures, the rubber became softer and stickier, while at lower temperatures it became hard and rigid.

The Amerindians in the Amazon rainforest developed ways to extract rubber from the rubber tree (Hevea brasiliensis), a member of the family Euphorbiaceae.

A white liquid called latex is extracted from the stem of the rubber tree, and contains rubber particles dispersed in an aqueous serum. The rubber, which constitutes about 35% of the latex, is chemically cis-1,4-polyisoprene ((C5H8)n).
Latex is practically a neutral substance, with a pH of 7.0 to 7.2. However, when it is exposed to the air for 12 to 24 hours, its pH falls and it spontaneously coagulates to form a solid mass of rubber.

Rubber produced in this fashion has disadvantages. For example, exposure to air causes it to mix with various materials, which is perceptible and can cause rot, as well as a temperature-dependent stickiness. Industrial treatment was developed to remove the impurities and vulcanize the rubber, a process that eliminated its undesirable qualities. This process gives it superior mechanical properties, and causes it to lose its sticky character, and become stable – resistant to solvents and variations in temperature.

Effects on indigenous population

The rubber boom and the associated need for a large workforce had a significant negative effect on the indigenous population across Brazil, Peru, Ecuador and Colombia. As rubber plantations grew, labor shortages increased. The owners of the plantations or rubber barons were rich, but those who collected the rubber made very little as a large amount of rubber was needed to be profitable. The rubber barons rounded up all the Indians and forced them to tap rubber out of the trees. One plantation started with 50,000 Indians but, when discovered, only 8,000 were still alive. Slavery and systematic brutality were widespread, and in some areas, 90% of the Indian population was wiped out. These rubber plantations were part of the Brazilian rubber market, which declined as rubber plantations in Southeast Asia became more effective.

Roger Casement, an Irishman traveling the Putumayo region of Peru as a British consul from 1910 to 1911, documented the abuse, slavery, murder and use of stocks for torture against the native Indians:

"The crimes charged against many men now in the employ of the Peruvian Amazon Company are of the most atrocious kind, including murder, violation, and constant flogging."

According to Wade Davis, author of One River:
"The horrendous atrocities that were unleashed on the Indian people of the Amazon during the height of the rubber boom were like nothing that had been seen since the first days of the Spanish Conquest."Rubber had catastrophic effects in parts of Upper Amazonia, but its impact should not be exaggerated nor extrapolated to the whole region. The Putumayo was a particularly horrific case. Many nearby rubber regions were not ruled by physical violence, but by the voluntary compliance implicit in patron-peon relations. Some native peoples benefited financially from their dealings with the white merchants. Others chose not to participate in the rubber business and stayed away from the main rivers. Because tappers worked in near complete isolation, they were not burdened by overseers and timetables. In Brazil (and probably elsewhere) tappers could, and did, adulterate rubber cargoes, by adding sand and flour to the rubber "balls", before sending them downriver. Flight into the thicket was a successful survival strategy and, because Indians were engaged in credit relations, it was a relatively common practice to vanish and work for other patrons, leaving debts unpaid.

First rubber boom, 1879–1912

For the first four and a half centuries following the discovery of the New World, the native populations of the Amazon Basin lived practically in isolation. The area was vast and impenetrable, no gold or precious stones had been found there, as neither colonial Brazil nor imperial Brazil was able to create incentives for development in the region. The regional economy was based on use of diverse natural resources in the region, but development was concentrated in coastal areas.

Rubber: sure wealth
The Industrial Revolution in Europe led to demand for uses that natural rubber could satisfy. At that time, it was exclusively found in the Amazon Basin. It was a desirable commodity, valued at a high price, and thought to create wealth and dividends for whoever would dare invest in the trade.

From the beginning of the second half of the 19th century, rubber began to exert a strong attraction to visionary entrepreneurs. The activity of latex extraction in the Amazon revealed its lucrative possibilities. Natural rubber soon achieved a place of distinction in the industries of Europe and North America, reaching a high price. This caused various people to travel to Brazil with the intention of learning more about the rubber tree and the process of latex extraction, from which they hoped to make their fortunes.

Because of the growth of rubber extraction, industrial processing and related activities, numerous cities and towns swelled on waves of immigrants. In 1855, over 2,100 tons of rubber was exported from the Amazon; a figure which reached 10,000 tons by 1879. Belém and Manaus were transformed and urbanized. Manaus was the first Brazilian city to be urbanized and the second to be electrified (the first was Campos dos Goytacazes, in Rio de Janeiro).

Development of railroads

Developers in Bolivia in 1846 began to promote the idea of constructing a railroad along the Madeira and Mamoré Rivers, in order to reach ports on the Atlantic Ocean for its export products. Its territory did not reach the coast.

Rivers had long been the key to navigation and travel through the Amazon Basin. An initial proposal was based on travel up the Mamoré in Bolivia and down the Madeira River in Brazil. However, the river course had substantial obstacles to industrial-level transport: twenty cataracts obstructed navigation. Constructing a railroad to bypass the problematic stretches of the rivers was the only solution.

In 1867, in Brazil, also trying to develop a simple way to transport the rubber, the engineers José and Francisco Keller organized a large expedition. They explored the rubber region of the Madeira River to find the most productive region and the most effective course for the railroad.

Although the idea of river navigation was complicated, in 1869, the North American engineer George Earl Church obtained from the Bolivian government a concession to create and explore a navigation enterprise that linked the Mamoré and Madeira Rivers.  Shortly afterwards, he realized the real difficulty of this undertaking. He changed the plans to  construction of a railroad.  Negotiations advanced and, by 1870, Church received permission from the Brazilian government to build a railroad along the rubber territories of the Madeira River.

Acre question

The increase in uncontrolled extraction of rubber was increasing tensions and close to provoking an international conflict. The Brazilian workers advanced further and further into the forests in the territory of Bolivia in search of new rubber trees for extraction, creating conflicts and skirmishes on the frontier towards the end of the 19th century. The Bolivian Army, led by José Plácido de Castro, was sent into the area to protect Bolivian resources.  The newly proclaimed Brazilian republic was drawing a considerable profit from the lucrative rubber trade, but the "Acre question" (as the border conflicts caused by rubber extraction became known) preoccupied it.

Intervention by the diplomat Barão do Rio Branco and the ambassador Joaquim Francisco de Assis Brasil, in part financed by the "rubber barons," led to negotiations with Bolivia and the signing of the Treaty of Petropolis, signed November 17, 1903, during the government of president Francisco de Paula Rodrigues Alves. While it halted conflict with Bolivia, the treaty guaranteed effective control by Brazil of the forests of Acre. 

Brazil was given possession of the region by Bolivia in exchange for territories in Mato Grosso, a payment of two million pounds sterling, and the compromise of constructing the railroad to connect to the Madeira River. This would enable Bolivia to transport its goods, primarily rubber, to the Brazilian ports of the Atlantic at the mouth of the Amazon River. Initially Belém in Pará was designated as the destination.

Because of the peaceful resolution of this issue, the capital of Acre was named Rio Branco after the Brazilian diplomat. Two of the municipalities in the state were named Assis Brasil and Plácido de Castro, after the ambassador and another key figure.

Madeira–Mamoré Railroad

The Madeira–Mamoré Railroad became known as the "Devil's Railroad" on account of having caused the death of around six thousand workers (in legends said to be one dead worker per railroad tie attached to the rails) was constructed by the United States corporation of Percival Farquhar. The construction of the railroad began in 1907 during the government of Afonso Pena and was one of the most significant episodes in the history of the occupation of the Amazon, revealing the clear attempt to integrate it into the global marketplace via the commercialization of rubber.

On April 30, 1912, the final stretch of the Madeira–Mamoré Railroad was completed. The occasion was commemorated by the arrival of the first train to the city of Guajará-Mirim, founded on that same day.

First, the price of latex fell precipitously in the world market, making the trade of rubber from the Amazon unviable.  Also, the transport of products that could have been transported by the Madeira–Mamoré Railroad were taken by two other railroads, one in Chile and the other in Argentina, and the Panama Canal, which became active on August 15, 1914.

Added to this, the natural factor, the Amazon forest, with its high level of rainfall and rapid growth, destroyed entire stretches of the rails, leveled ground, and bridges, reclaiming a large part of the way that people had insisted on clearing to construct the railroad.

The railroad was partially taken out of service in the 1930s and completely in 1972. That year the Trans-Amazonian highway (BR-230) opened.  Today, from a total of 364 km of length of railway, about seven remain in active use, used for tourist purposes. The people of Rondonia have fought for revitalization of the railroad, but as of December 1, 2006, the work remains unstarted.

Apogee, elegance, and luxury

 

Belém, the capital of Pará state, as well as Manaus, the capital of Amazonas, were the most developed and prosperous cities in Brazil during the rubber boom. They were located in strategic sites, and prominent men in the rubber industry built their numerous and wealthy residences in each. These citizens created the demand that led to both cities being electrified and given running water and sewers.

Their apogee was reached between 1890 and 1920, when they acquired electric trams, avenues built on cleared gullies, as well as imposing and luxurious buildings, such as the polished Teatro Amazonas, the government palace, the municipal market, and the customs house, in the case of Manaus; and the fish market, the iron market, Teatro da Paz, corridors of mango trees, and various residential palaces in the case of Belém, constructed in large part by the intendant Antônio Lemos. These technologies and construction did not take place anywhere else in south and southeast Brazil of the time.

The European influence later became notable in Manaus and Belém, in the architecture and culture; and the two cities enjoyed their greatest economies and influence in the 19th century. The Amazon Basin was the source in the era for nearly 40% of all Brazil's exports.  The new riches of Manaus made the city the world capital in the sale of diamonds. Thanks to rubber, the per capita income of Manaus was twice as much as the coffee-producing region (São Paulo, Rio de Janeiro and Espírito Santo).

As payment for the export of rubber, the workers were paid in pounds sterling (£), the currency of the United Kingdom, which circulated in Manaus and Belém during this period.

End of the Amazon's rubber monopoly
The Madeira–Mamoré Railroad, finished in 1912, arrived too late.  The Amazon was already losing primacy in rubber production, as the British government had planted rubber trees in its colonies in Malaysia, Sri Lanka, and tropical Africa. These rubber trees were planted from seeds that Henry Wickham had smuggled out of Brazil in 1876. These plantations were able to produce latex with greater efficiency and productivity. Consequently, with lower costs and a lower final price, the British Empire assumed control of the world rubber market.

The Amazon's rubber was undercut in the world market and demand for it fell. This rapidly resulted in the stagnation of the regional economy. There was a lack of entrepreneurial or governmental vision to find alternatives for development. The "rubber barons" and economic elite followed the money, leaving the region to seek their next fortunes elsewhere.

 Although the railroad and the cities of Porto Velho and Guajará-Mirim remained as a legacy to this bright economic period, the recession caused by the end of the rubber boom left profound scars on the Amazon region. There was a massive loss of state tax income, high levels of unemployment, rural and urban emigration, and abandoned and unneeded housing. Those who remained in the region had few expectations for the future. Deprived of their income, the rubber workers remained in the periphery of Manaus, searching for new work. Because of the lack of housing, in the 1920s they built the cidade flutuante ("floating city"), a type of residence that was consolidated in the 1960s.

To try to stem the crisis, the central government of Brazil created the Superintendência de Defesa da Borracha ("Superintendency of Defence of Rubber"). It was inefficient and unable to effect real change, and, for this reason, it was eliminated soon after its creation.

In the 1930s, Henry Ford, the United States automobile pioneer, undertook the cultivation of rubber trees in the Amazon region. He established the city of Fordlândia in the west part of Pará state, specifically for this end, together with worker housing and planned community amenities. The plantation suffered from a leaf pest and the effort failed.

Second rubber boom, 1942–1945
Changes in the world economy during the Second World War created a new rubber boom, although it was of brief duration.  As Japan dominated the western Pacific Ocean from the beginning of 1942 and invaded Malaysia, the rubber plantations there came under their control. As a result, the Allies lost access to 97% of Asian rubber production.

United States companies invested in the region and their managers played an active role. New buildings were constructed in Belém and Manaus. An example was the Grande Hotel, a luxurious hotel constructed in Belém in only three years, which today is the Hilton Hotel. The US also developed new synthetic rubbers such as Government Rubber-Styrene which helped to bridge the inevitable gap in rubber supplies for truck and car tyres.

Rubber battle
Eager to supply the Allied Forces with the rubber needed for war equipment, the Brazilian government made an agreement with the United States government (the Washington Accords). It set goals for the large-scale extraction of Amazon latex, an operation which became known as the Batalha da borracha ("rubber battle"), for the manpower and effort devoted to the project.

After the rubber forests were abandoned, no more than 35,000 workers remained in the region. The great challenge of Brazil was to increase the annual production of latex from 18,000 to 45,000 tons, as set in the agreement. For this, 100,000 men were needed.

During the same period, the northeast part of Brazil had suffered a devastating drought and an unprecedented crisis for its farmers. Brazil decided to recruit new rubber workers from that region. The Estado Novo in 1943 ordered the compulsory enlisting of workers in the Serviço Especial de Mobilização de Trabalhadores para a Amazônia (SEMTA; "Special Service of Mobilization of Workers for the Amazon"), based in the northeast, in Fortaleza. Brazilian president Getúlio Vargas reduced the problem of the economic blight and at the same time increased colonization of the Amazon Basin.

In addition to SEMTA, the government created other organizations to support the rubber battle: the  Superintendência para o Abastecimento do Vale da Amazônia (SAVA: the Superintendency for the Provisioning of the Amazon Valley), the Serviço Especial de Saúde Pública (SESP: the Special Service of Public Health), and the Serviço de Navegação da Amazônia e de Administração do Porto do Pará (SNAPP: Navigation Service of the Amazon and Administration of the Port of Pará). The Banco de Crédito da Borracha (Rubber Credit Bank) was also created. Later in 1950 it became the Banco de Crédito da Amazônia (Amazon Credit Bank).

The international organization Rubber Development Corporation (RDC), financed with capital from United States industries, covered the expenses of relocating the migrants (known at the time as brabos). The United States government paid the Brazilian government $100 for every worker delivered to the Amazon.

Thousands of workers from various regions of Brazil were transported under force to obligatory servitude. Many suffered death by tropical diseases of the region, such as malaria and yellow fever. The northeast region sent 54,000 workers to the Amazon alone, 30,000 of which were from Ceará. These new rubber workers were called soldados da borracha ("rubber soldiers") in a clear allusion to the role of the latex in supplying the U.S. factories with the rubber necessary to fight the war.

In 1849 Manaus had 5,000 inhabitants, expanding in the next half-century to 70,000. During World War II, the region again enjoyed prosperity. Money began to circulate in Manaus, Belém, and other cities and towns nearby, and the regional economy gained strength.

For many workers, it was a one-way journey. About 30,000 rubber workers died in the Amazon, after having exhausted their energies extracting the "white gold." They died of malaria, yellow fever, and hepatitis; they also suffered attacks by animals such as panthers, serpents, and scorpions. The Brazilian government did not fulfill its promise to return the "rubber soldiers" to their homes at the end of the war as heroes and with housing comparable to that of the military veterans. It is estimated that only about 6,000 workers managed to return to their homes, at their own expense. In the 21st century, the decreasing number of survivors have challenged the government for recognition and compensation for themselves and their families for their contributions to the war effort.

See also
 Peru: Abuses against the Putumayo Indians
 Euclides da Cunha
 Environmental history of Latin America
 Patagonian sheep farming boom
 Latin American economy
 Brazilian cacao boom

Notes

Further reading

 Barham, Bradford L., and Oliver T. Coomes. "Reinterpreting the Amazon rubber boom: investment, the state, and Dutch disease." Latin American Research Review 29.2 (1994): 73–109.
 Barham, Bradford, and Oliver Coomes. "Wild rubber: Industrial organisation and the microeconomics of extraction during the Amazon rubber boom (1860–1920)." Journal of Latin American Studies 26.1 (1994): 37–72.
 Bunker, Stephen G. "Modes of extraction, unequal exchange, and the progressive underdevelopment of an extreme periphery: the Brazilian Amazon, 1600–1980." American Journal of Sociology 89.5 (1984): 1017–64.
 Burns, E. Bradford. "Manaus, 1910: portrait of a boom town." Journal of Inter-American Studies 7.3 (1965): 400–21.
 Coomes, Oliver T., and Bradford L. Barham. "The Amazon rubber boom: labor control, resistance, and failed plantation development revisited." The Hispanic American Historical Review 74.2 (1994): 231–57.
 Casement, Roger. The Putumayo: the devil's paradise; travels in the Peruvian Amazon region and an account of the atrocities committed upon the Indians therein. T. F. Unwin 1913.
 Casement, Roger. The Amazon journal of Roger Casement. Angus Mitchell 1997. 
 Fifer, J. Valerie. "The empire builders: a history of the Bolivian rubber boom and the rise of the house of Suarez." Journal of Latin American Studies 2.2 (1970): 113–46.
 Frank, Zephyr, and Aldo Musacchio. "Brazil in the international rubber trade, 1870–1930." From Silver to Cocaine (2006): 271–99.
 Melby, John. "Rubber river: an account of the rise and collapse of the Amazon boom." The Hispanic American Historical Review 22.3 (1942): 452–69.
 Resor, Randolph R. "Rubber in Brazil: Dominance and collapse, 1876–1945." Business History Review 51.3 (1977): 341–66.
 Romanoff, Steven. "Food and debt among rubber tappers in the Bolivian Amazon." Human Organization 51.2 (1992): 122–35.
 Simonian, Ligia TL. "Women Rubber‐Tappers in the Brazilian Amazon: A Life of Work Silenced." Anthropology of Work Review 12.4 (1991): 11–16.
 Stanfield, Michael Edward. Red Rubber, Bleeding Trees: Violence, Slavery, and Empire in Northwest Amazonia, 1850–1933
 Vadjunec, Jacqueline M., Marianne Schmink, and Carlos Valerio A. Gomes. "Rubber tapper citizens: emerging places, policies, and shifting rural-urban identities in Acre, Brazil." Journal of Cultural Geography 28.1 (2011): 73–98.
 Vallvé, Frederic. The impact of the rubber boom on the indigenous peoples of the Bolivian lowlands (1850–1920). Georgetown University, 2010.
 Weinstein, Barbara. The Amazon rubber boom, 1850–1920. Stanford University Press, 1983.

External links
 Aitchison, Mark. "The Tree that Weeps: A History of Amazon Rubber." Brazilmax.com, n.d. Web. 1 Jun 2011. https://web.archive.org/web/20110720075509/http://www.brazilmax.com/columnist.cfm/idcolumn/38.
 Association of Petrochemicals, Producers In Europe. "APPE-Experimania timeline." n.p.,  Web. 1 Jun 2011. https://web.archive.org/web/20110927190628/http://www.petrochemistry.net/timeline-synthetic-rubber.html.
 Freudenrich, Craig. "How Rubber Works." HowStuffWorks, n.d. Web. 1 Jun 2011. http://science.howstuffworks.com/rubber3.htm.

 Manufacturers Association, Rubber. "Rubber FAQs." Rubber Manufacturers Association, n.d. Web. 1 Jun 2011. https://web.archive.org/web/20150810194108/http://www.rma.org/about-rma/rubber-faqs/.
 "Rubber." Dictionary.com Unabridged. Random House, Inc., 31 May 2011 http://dictionary.reference.com/browse/rubber.
 Rubber Boom
 The International Natural Rubber Market, 1870–1930

''This article is based on a translation of the corresponding article from the Portuguese Wikipedia.

Rubber
First Brazilian Republic
History of indigenous peoples of South America
Amazon basin
Acre (state)
Pará
History of agriculture in Brazil
Commodity booms
History of Amazonas (Brazilian state)
Rubber boom